Roy Winfield Harper (July 26, 1905 – February 13, 1994) was a United States district judge of the United States District Court for the Eastern District of Missouri and the United States District Court for the Western District of Missouri.

Education and career

Born on July 26, 1905, in Gibson, Missouri, Harper received an Bachelor of Arts degree in 1929 from the University of Missouri and a Bachelor of Laws in 1929 from the University of Missouri School of Law. He was an attorney with the Real Estate Appraisal Division of Shell Oil Company from 1929 to 1931. He was in private practice in Steele, Missouri from 1931 to 1934 and in Caruthersville, Missouri, from 1934 to 1947. Harper was a major in the United States Army Air Corps from 1942 to 1945.

Federal judicial service

Harper received a recess appointment from President Harry S. Truman on August 7, 1947, to a joint seat on the United States District Court for the Eastern District of Missouri and the United States District Court for the Western District of Missouri vacated by Judge John Caskie Collet. President Truman nominated Harper to a judgeship on November 24, 1947, but the United States Senate did not confirm his nomination, so his service terminated on December 19, 1947. However, President Truman gave him a second recess appointment on December 20, 1947. The Senate still did not confirm his nomination, so his service terminated on June 22, 1948.  The same day, President Truman gave him yet a third recess appointment, and Truman nominated him again January 13, 1949. The Senate finally confirmed Harper on January 31, 1949, and he received his commission on February 2, 1949. He served as Chief Judge of the Eastern District from 1959 to 1971, and he was a member of the Judicial Conference of the United States from 1965 to 1971. On January 5, 1971, Judge Harper assumed senior status. He was a member of the Judicial Panel on Multidistrict Litigation from 1977 to 1983. Harper died February 13, 1994, in Chesterfield, Missouri.

Note

Bibliography
 Missouri Historical Society St. Louis, Missouri, Roy W. Harper family papers, 1950–1990. 7 boxes; collection contains case files, printed opinions, correspondence, and miscellaneous papers. The collection remained unprocessed as of August 1997.
 University of Missouri and the State Historical Society of Missouri Western Historical Manuscript Collection Columbia, Missouri
 Paul Caruthers Jones papers, 1943–1969; 60 ft.; finding aid; 13 folders pertaining to Harper.
 Forrest Smith papers, 1940–1953; 6,658 folders, 11 vols., and 8 card files; finding aid; represented.
 George A. Spencer papers, 1948–1960; 653 folders, 9 boxes, and 1 vol.; finding aid; restricted; represented.

References

Sources

External links

 https://web.archive.org/web/20090210153545/http://harpersinmissouri.com/Page9.html
 
 
 
 
 
 LOG OF PRESIDENT TRUMAN’S ELEVENTH VISIT TO KEY WEST, FLORIDA MARCH 7- 27, 1952

|-

1905 births
1994 deaths
Lawyers from St. Louis
University of Missouri alumni
Missouri lawyers
Judges of the United States District Court for the Eastern District of Missouri
Judges of the United States District Court for the Western District of Missouri
United States district court judges appointed by Harry S. Truman
20th-century American judges
Unsuccessful recess appointments to United States federal courts
People from Caruthersville, Missouri
People from Dunklin County, Missouri
Military personnel from Missouri
United States Army Air Forces officers